Paraniesslia is a genus of fungi within the Niessliaceae family. There are 2 species

References

External links
Paraniesslia at Index Fungorum

Sordariomycetes genera
Niessliaceae